The Louisville and Nashville Railroad , commonly called the L&N, was a Class I railroad that operated freight and passenger services in the southeast United States.

Chartered by the Commonwealth of Kentucky in 1850, the road grew into one of the great success stories of American business. Operating under one name continuously for 132 years, it survived civil war and economic depression and several waves of social and technological change. As one of the premier Southern railroads, the L&N extended its reach far beyond its namesake cities, stretching to St. Louis, Memphis, Atlanta, and New Orleans. The railroad was economically strong throughout its lifetime, operating freight and passenger trains in a manner that earned it the nickname, "The Old Reliable."

Growth of the railroad continued until its purchase and the tumultuous rail consolidations of the 1980s which led to continual successors.

In 1971 the Seaboard Coast Line Railroad, successor to the Atlantic Coast Line Railroad, purchased the remainder of the L&N shares it did not already own, and the company became a subsidiary. By 1982 the railroad industry was consolidating quickly, and the Seaboard Coast Line absorbed the Louisville & Nashville Railroad entirely. Then in 1986, the Seaboard System merged with the C&O and B&O (known as the Chessie System) and the combined company became CSX Transportation (CSX), which now owns and operates all of the former Louisville and Nashville lines.

Early history and Civil War
Its first line extended barely south of Louisville, Kentucky, and it took until 1859 to span the 180-odd miles to its second namesake city of Nashville.

During the Civil War, different parts of the network were pressed into service by both armies at various times, and considerable damage from wear, battle, and sabotage occurred. (For example, during the Battle of Lebanon in July 1863, the company's depot in Lebanon, Kentucky, was used as a stronghold by outnumbered Union troops). However, the company benefited from being based in the Union state of Kentucky, and the fact that Nashville fell to Union forces within the first year of the war and remained in their hands for its duration. It profited from Northern haulage contracts for troops and supplies, paid in sound Federal greenbacks, as opposed to the rapidly depreciating Confederate dollars. After the war, other railroads in the South were devastated to the point of collapse, and the general economic depression meant that labor and materials to repair its roads could be had fairly cheaply.

Buoyed by these fortunate circumstances, the firm began an expansion that never really stopped. Within 30 years the network reached from Ohio and Missouri to Louisiana and Florida. By 1884, the firm had such importance that it was included in the Dow Jones Transportation Average, the first American stock market index. It was such a large customer of the Rogers Locomotive and Machine Works, the country's second largest locomotive maker, that in 1879 the firm presented L&N with a free locomotive as a thank-you bonus.

Coal and capital in the Gilded Age

Since all locomotives of the time were steam-powered, many railroads had favored coal as their engines' fuel source after wood-burning models were found unsatisfactory. The L&N guaranteed not only its own fuel sources but a steady revenue stream by pushing its lines into the difficult but coal-rich terrain of eastern Kentucky, and also well into northern Alabama. There the small town of Birmingham had recently been founded amidst undeveloped deposits of coal, iron ore and limestone, the basic ingredients of steel production. The arrival of L&N transport and investment capital helped create a great industrial city and the South's first postwar urban success story.

In the Gilded Age of the late 19th century there were no such things as anti-trust or fair-competition laws and very little financial regulation. Business was a keen and mean affair, and the L&N was a formidable competitor. It would exclude upstarts like the Tennessee Central Railway Company from critical infrastructure like urban stations. Where that wasn't possible, as with the Nashville, Chattanooga and St. Louis Railway (which was older than the L&N), it simply used its financial muscle—in 1880 it acquired a controlling interest in its chief competitor. A public outcry convinced the L&N directors that there were limits to their power. They discreetly continued the NC&StL as a separate subsidiary, but now working with, instead of in competition with, the L&N.

Ironically, in 1902 financial speculations by financier J.P. Morgan delivered control of the L&N to its rival Atlantic Coast Line Railroad, but that company made no attempt to control L&N operations, and for many decades there were no consequences of this change.

20th century

The World Wars placed heavy demand on the L&N. Its widespread and robust network coped well with the demands of war transport and production, and the resulting profits harked back to the boost it had received from the Civil War. In the postwar period, the line shifted gradually to diesel power, and the new streamlined engines pulled some of the most elegant passenger trains of the last great age of passenger rail, such as the Dixie Flyer, the Humming Bird, and the Pan-American.

Though well past its 100th anniversary, the line was still growing. In 1957, the Nashville, Chattanooga & St. Louis was finally fully merged. In the 1960s, acquisitions in Illinois allowed a long-sought entry into the premier railroad nexus of Chicago, and some of the battered remains of the old rival, the Tennessee Central, were sold to the L&N as well.

In 1971 the Seaboard Coast Line Railroad, successor to the Atlantic Coast Line Railroad, purchased the remainder of the L&N shares it did not already own, and the company became a subsidiary. Prior to the purchase, the L&N, like other railroads, had curtailed passenger service in response to dwindling ridership. Amtrak, the government-formed passenger railway service, took over the few remaining L&N passenger trains in 1971. In 1979, amid great lamentations in the press, the last passenger service over L&N rails ceased when Amtrak discontinued The Floridian, which had connected Louisville with Nashville and continued to Florida via Birmingham.

By 1982 the railroad industry was consolidating quickly, and the Seaboard Coast Line absorbed the Louisville & Nashville Railroad entirely. The merged company was known as "SCL/L&N", "Family Lines," and was depicted as such on the railroad's rolling stock.  During the next few years several smaller acquisitions resulted in the creation of the Seaboard System Railroad. Yet more consolidation was ahead, and in 1986, the Seaboard System merged into the C&O/B&O combined system known as the Chessie System. The combined company became CSX Transportation (CSX), which now owns and operates all of the former Louisville and Nashville lines, except for some routes abandoned or sold off.

Legacy
A number of historical groups and publications devoted to the line exist, and L&N equipment is well represented in the model railroading hobby. The L&N Railroad is mentioned by 
country music pioneer Jimmie Rodgers in his "Blue Yodel #7." It is also the subject of two other songs: the 2003 Rhonda Vincent bluegrass song "Kentucky Borderline", and "The L&N Don't Stop Here Anymore" by Jean Ritchie and individually performed by Michelle Shocked, Johnny Cash, Billy Bragg & Joe Henry and Kathy Mattea. 
Dutch blues/rockband The Bintangs had a hit in the Dutch charts in the late 1960s with "Ridin' on the L&N" (a cover from the Dan Burley / Lionel Hampton – composition from 1946). 
This composition also was covered by John Mayall & The Bluesbreakers.

In 1926 the L&N turned over approximately 137 acres to the Kentucky State Park Commission, making possible the creation of the state's Natural Bridge State Park.

Passenger operations

The Humming Bird and Pan-American, both from Cincinnati to New Orleans and Memphis, were two of the L&N's most popular passenger trains that ran entirely on its own lines. However, the Humming Bird later added a Chicago to New Orleans section in conjunction with the Chicago & Eastern Illinois Railroad utilizing the Georgian north of Nashville. (The Official Guide of the Railroads, February, 1952) The railroad also hosted other named trains, including:

 Azalean (Cincinnati – New Orleans) (had through Pullman Company Sleeping Cars between Cincinnati and New York over the Pennsylvania Railroad) ran combined with the Washington – Atlanta – New Orleans Express (New York – New Orleans in conjunction with the Pennsylvania Railroad, Southern Railway and the West Point Route); these trains combined south of Montgomery.
 Pre-Amtrak Crescent (New York – New Orleans in conjunction with the Pennsylvania Railroad, Southern Railway and the West Point Route)
 Dixie Flagler (Chicago – Miami in conjunction with the Chicago & Eastern Illinois Railroad, Nashville, Chattanooga and St. Louis Railway, Atlantic Coast Line Railroad and the Florida East Coast Railway)
 Dixie Flyer and Dixie Limited (Chicago and St. Louis to Jacksonville in conjunction with the Chicago & Eastern Illinois Railroad,  Nashville, Chattanooga and St. Louis Railway, Central of Georgia Railway and the Atlantic Coast Line Railroad)
 Dixieland (Chicago – Miami in conjunction with the Chicago & Eastern Illinois Railroad, Nashville, Chattanooga and St. Louis Railway, Atlantic Coast Line Railroad and the Florida East Coast Railway)
 Dixiana (Chicago – Miami in conjunction with the Chicago & Eastern Illinois Railroad, Nashville, Chattanooga and St. Louis Railway, Atlantic Coast Line Railroad and the Florida East Coast Railway)
 Flamingo (Cincinnati – Jacksonville in conjunction with the Central of Georgia Railway, Atlantic Coast Line)
 Florida Arrow (seasonal train, Chicago - Louisville -Birmingham - Miami in conjunction with the Pennsylvania Railroad, Atlantic Coast Line Railroad and the Florida East Coast Railway) 

 Georgian (Originally St. Louis – Atlanta, later changed to Chicago-Atlanta in conjunction with the Chicago & Eastern Illinois Railroad and the Nashville, Chattanooga and St. Louis Railway)
 Gulf Wind (New Orleans – Jacksonville in conjunction with the Seaboard Air Line Railroad)
 Piedmont Limited (New York – New Orleans in conjunction with the Pennsylvania Railroad, Southern Railway and the West Point Route)
 Southland (Chicago – St. Petersburg, Tampa and Miami in conjunction with the Pennsylvania Railroad, Central of Georgia Railway and the Atlantic Coast Line Railroad. The Wabash Railroad had a connection in Fort Wayne, for trips from Detroit.)
 South Wind (Chicago – Miami in conjunction with the Pennsylvania Railroad, Atlantic Coast Line Railroad and the Florida East Coast Railway)

The L&N was one of few railroads to discontinue a passenger train that was en route. On January 9, 1969, as soon as a judge lifted the injunction preventing its discontinuance, the L&N discontinued its southbound Humming Bird at Birmingham, in mid-run from Cincinnati to New Orleans. The 14 passengers continuing south did so by bus.

Preservation

There are several preservation organizations of L&N equipment and L&N lines, such as the Kentucky Railway Museum, The Historic Railpark and Train Museum in Bowling Green, Kentucky, and the L&N Historic Society.

The city of Atlanta, Georgia, is home to the General and the Texas, two 4-4-0 locomotives originally built for the Western and Atlantic Railroad, which was later leased to L&N predecessor Nashville, Chattanooga, and St. Louis. The lease of the W&A was passed to, and renewed by L&N and its successors.  The General and the Texas became famous for being participants in The Great Locomotive Chase during the Civil War. The General had been placed on display in the railroad's Union Depot in Chattanooga in 1901. In 1957, the L&N removed the engine and restored it to operating condition. The engine pulled the railroad's wooden center-door Jim Crow combine coach No. 665 as it traveled throughout the eastern U.S. as part of the observance of the Civil War Centennial, including a visit to the 1964 New York World's Fair. Between 1966 and 1971, a legal battle ensued between the railroad and the city of Chattanooga as the former had planned to send the engine to Georgia, while the latter claimed to be the owners of the engine. After the dispute was settled, the engine was formally presented to the state of Georgia in 1971. The engine currently resides at the Southern Museum of Civil War and Locomotive History in Kennesaw, Georgia, while the Texas is currently at the North Carolina Transportation Museum in Spencer, North Carolina undergoing restoration for inclusion into an addition to house it and the cyclorama painting of the battle of Atlanta. The Texas should return to Georgia in late 2016.

The Kentucky Railway Museum consists of many pieces of L&N equipment, as well as a portion of the Lebanon Branch. The museum owns the following L&N equipment: K2A Light Pacific 4-6-2 No. 152, a steam locomotive; heavyweight coaches Nos. 2572 and 2554; an observation car; heavyweight combine No. 1603; combine coach No. 665; sleeper the Pearl River, the Pullman heavyweight 10 section sleeper-lounge Mt. Broderick which was assigned to the L&N but owned and operated by Pullman; several baggage cars; a steam-powered crane; and E-6 diesel locomotive No. 770. All of the last seven pieces of equipment listed are in need of restoration.

The Historic Railpark and Train Museum owns or operates several pieces of L&N equipment, including an E-8 diesel locomotive, a Railway Post Office car, dining car No. 2799, a sleeping car, an observation car, along with a Jim Crow combine in need of major overhaul.

There are several other museums that own L&N equipment, including the Bluegrass Railroad Museum.

L&N 2132 a South Louisville shop
Steam locomotive is also on static display in Corbin Ky. 2132 was moved from Bainbridge Georgia to Corbin and underwent a fully cosmetic restoration. Along with 2132 and her tender is L&N caboose 1056.

The Wilderness Road Trail is a rail trail built on the ROW from Cumberland Gap National Historical Park to Ewing, Virginia.

See also

 Family Lines System
 List of Louisville and Nashville Railroad precursors
 Louisville & Nashville Railroad Co. v. Mottley—famous U.S. Supreme Court case involving the railroad
 Seaboard System

References

Further reading
 
 Cotterill, R. S. "The Louisville and Nashville Railroad 1861-1865," American Historical Review (1924) 29#4 pp. 700–715 in JSTOR

External links

 L&N Railroad Historical Society
 L&N in Georgia
 L&N in Alabama
 L&N model photos
 A 1933 article on the Louisville and Nashville Railroad
 L&N Historic Railpark Museum
 Finding Aid, Louisville and Nashville Railroad Company records, University of Louisville Archives and Records Center
 Louisville and Nashville Railroad Company  Magazine – a digital collection of the company's employees' magazine.
 1958 L&N Railroad Map

 
Atlantic Coast Line Railroad
Railway companies established in 1850
1850 establishments in Kentucky
1982 disestablishments in Florida
Defunct companies based in Louisville, Kentucky
Defunct Florida railroads
Defunct Kentucky railroads
Defunct Tennessee railroads
Defunct Virginia railroads
Former Class I railroads in the United States
Former components of the Dow Jones Industrial Average
Kentucky in the American Civil War
Predecessors of CSX Transportation
Companies based in Louisville, Kentucky
Companies based in Jacksonville, Florida
Railway companies disestablished in 1982
Seaboard System Railroad
Tennessee in the American Civil War
Transportation in Louisville, Kentucky
Transportation in Nashville, Tennessee
Defunct Alabama railroads
Defunct Ohio railroads
Defunct Missouri railroads
Defunct Illinois railroads
Defunct Indiana railroads
Defunct Georgia (U.S. state) railroads
Defunct South Carolina railroads
Defunct North Carolina railroads
Defunct Louisiana railroads
Defunct Mississippi railroads